Siesta Key is an American reality television series that aired for five seasons on MTV from July 31, 2017 to January 19, 2023. The show is inspired by the mid-2000s reality television series Laguna Beach: The Real Orange County. The fifth season, subtitled Miami Moves, premiered on October 27, 2022.

Production
On October 2, 2017, MTV ordered eight additional episodes, bringing the first season to a total of 18 episodes. The episodes premiered on January 15, 2018. On December 17, 2018, it was announced that the show would be returning for a second season, which premiered with two episodes on January 22, 2019. On May 13, 2019, MTV announced that the show had been renewed for a third season, which premiered on January 7, 2020. On November 18, 2020, the series was renewed for a fourth season, which premiered on May 12, 2021.

The first four seasons were filmed in Sarasota, Florida. The fifth season, filmed in Miami and subtitled Miami Moves, premiered on MTV on October 27, 2022.

Cast

Main
Alex Kompothecras (seasons 1–3)
Juliette Porter
Brandon Gomes
Madisson Hausburg
Garrett Miller (seasons 1–4)
Kelsey Owens (seasons 1–4; recurring season 5)
Chloe Trautman-Long
Amanda Miller (seasons 4–5; recurring seasons 1–3)
Sam Logan (seasons 4–5; recurring season 3)
Cara Geswelli (season 5; recurring seasons 2–4)
Jordana Barnes (season 5; recurring season 4)

Recurring
Lexie Salameh
Paul Apostolides (seasons 1–3)
Ben Riney (seasons 1–3)
Carson Wall (seasons 1–3)
Hannah Starr (seasons 1, 3–4)
Paige Hausburg (seasons 1, 3)
Canvas Brummel (seasons 1–2)
Tarik Jenkins (season 1)
Camilla Cattaneo (seasons 2–4)
Jared Kelderman (seasons 2–3)
Tawni Nix (season 2)
Alana Sherman (season 2)
Ish Soto (seasons 3–5)
Mike Vazquez (seasons 3–5)
Joe Jenkins (seasons 3–4)
Tate Sweatt (seasons 3–4)
Alyssa Salerno (season 3)
Robby Hayes (season 3)
JJ Mizell (season 3)
Jake Peterson (season 3)
Meghan Bischoff (seasons 4–5)
Chris Long (seasons 4–5)
Clark Drum (seasons 4–5)
Michael Wheary (seasons 4–5)
Max Strong (season 4)
Will Gray (season 4)
Kenna Quesenberry (season 4)
Serena Kerrigan (season 4)
Teenear Renee (season 5)
Christine Pierre (season 5)

Episodes

Series overview

Season 1 (2017–18)

Season 2 (2019)

Season 3 (2020)

Season 4 (2021–22)

Season 5: Miami Moves (2022–23)

Special

Controversy and criticism
The series was controversial prior to airing, due to star Alex Kompothecras being a friend of four Florida men who engaged in a viral act of animal cruelty by dragging a live shark behind a boat. Kompothecras was caught on camera shooting a shark, and also had uploaded racist posts to Instagram. The premiere party was cancelled after death threats were made against the cast.

On June 16, 2020, MTV announced that they parted ways with Alex Kompothecras and that the second half of season 3 would be re-edited to reflect that.

References

External links
 
 

2010s American reality television series
2017 American television series debuts
2020s American reality television series
English-language television shows
MTV original programming
Television shows set in Florida